Angel De Service Espoy (October 2, 1879 - January 31, 1963) was a Spanish American painter. He was best known for his paintings of the California seascapes and landscapes of poppies and lupines. His landscapes and marine art were exhibited at the Los Angeles City Hall, Oakland Museum of California, Los Angeles Municipal Art Gallery and Loyola University. His style was influenced by the Barbizon school of painters.

Early life 

Angel Espoy was born on October 2, 1879, Villa Nueva, Spain. He left home at eighteen to work as first mate in the Spanish merchant marines. In the marines, he became familiar with clipper ships. He traveled to Barcelona, Spain where he studied under the Spanish painter Joaquín Sorolla. He was married to Concepcion Espey and had one child, Henry M. Espoy. During his years at sea he became captain of a four-rigged vessel, which operated in the Asia.

Professional life
His father had tobacco interests in the Philippines, where Espoy made trips in 1900. Early in his career, he spent time in Havana, Cuba, where he painted designs on furniture. He left Cuba and came to New York City in 1904.

Animated Film Corporation

Espoy moved to San Francisco in 1914 where he made cartoons for movies for seven years and painting on weekends with artists Manuel Valencia, Carl Jonnevold and John Califano. Espoy worked at the Animated Film Corporation in San Francisco, of which, Byington Ford, was director along with Tack Knight and Pinto Colvig. The endeavor ended with the entry of the U.S. into World War I.

Southern California

In 1922, Espoy moved to Southern California where he sold his paintings. He was a member of the Los Angeles Art Association and exhibited at Barker Bros. Galleries in Los Angeles. His landscape and marine works were held at the Los Angeles City Hall; Oakland Museum of California; Loyola University. The painting The Full Rigged Ship was exhibited at the Laguna Beach Art Gallery. 

In March 1938, Espoy's California wildflower landscapes and marine art were exhibited at the Frances Webb Gallery in Los Angeles. His style was influenced by the Barbizon school of painters. In October 1938, he exhibited twelve oil paintings of landscapes and marine art, including California in Bloom and Poetic Monterey, at the Los Angeles Municipal Art Gallery.

Death

Espoy died on January 31, 1963, in Seal Beach, California. He was survived by his son Henry M. Espoy and two grandchildren. Funeral services were arranged by the Dilday Family Funeral Home and the Saint Anne Catholic Church in Seal Beach.

References

External links

 
 Benezit Dictionary of Artists
 The paintings of Angel Espoy
 Angel De Service Espoy Artist Biography & Facts

  

1879 births
1963 deaths
20th-century male artists
American male painters
Spanish emigrants to the United States